Sheykh Tappeh is a village in Aq Altin Rural District, in the Central District of Aqqala County, Golestan Province, Iran. At the 2006 census, its population was 393, in 80 families.

References 

Populated places in Aqqala County